Nuclear Physics A, Nuclear Physics B, Nuclear Physics B: Proceedings Supplements and discontinued Nuclear Physics  are peer-reviewed scientific journals published by Elsevier. The scope of Nuclear Physics A is nuclear and hadronic physics, and that of Nuclear Physics B is high energy physics, quantum field theory, statistical systems, and mathematical physics.

Nuclear Physics was established in 1956, and then split into Nuclear Physics A and Nuclear Physics B in 1967. A supplement series to Nuclear Physics B, called Nuclear Physics B: Proceedings Supplements has been published from 1987 onwards.

Nuclear Physics B is part of the SCOAP3 initiative.

Abstracting and indexing

Nuclear Physics A
 Current Contents/Physics, Chemical, & Earth Sciences

Nuclear Physics B
 Current Contents/Physics, Chemical, & Earth Sciences

References

External links
 Nuclear Physics
 Nuclear Physics A
 Nuclear Physics B
 Nuclear Physics B: Proceedings Supplements

Elsevier academic journals
Nuclear physics journals
Publications established in 1956
English-language journals